Hrnčíř is a surname. Notable people with the surname include:

Jan Hrnčíř (born 1977), Czech politician
Josef Hrnčíř (1921–2014), Czech conductor, musicologist, and music theorist

Czech-language surnames